James Yorke Macgregor Scarlett, 4th Baron Abinger (13 March 1871, London – 11 December 1903, Paris), was a British peer.

Life
James Yorke Macgregor Scarlett was educated at Eton and Trinity College, Cambridge. He was a captain in the 3rd Battery Queen's Own Cameron Highlanders, and saw active service in the Second Boer War, leaving England for South Africa in February 1900.

He owned . His town address was at 46 Cornwall Gardens, but he also owned Inverlochy Castle (today Inverlochy Castle Hotel), Invernessshire. He was a member of the Carlton Club.

He died of heart failure caused by an accidental fall down a flight of stairs at a restaurant in Paris, France.

Family
Scarlett was the son of William Scarlett, 3rd Baron Abinger, and Helen Magruder. His sister was Evelina Haverfield. He succeeded his father to the title in 1892, and died unmarried without male heirs. The title of Baron Abinger then went to his second cousin Shelley Scarlett, who descended from the 3rd son of the 1st Baron.

References

"Abinger, Baron (Scarlett) (Baron UK 1835)." Debrett's Peerage & Baronetage 1995. London: Debrett's Peerage Limited, 1995. pp. 8–9.

External links

1871 births
1903 deaths
Accidental deaths from falls
Accidental deaths in France
Alumni of Trinity College, Cambridge
James 4
Eldest sons of British hereditary barons
People educated at Eton College